Zeller Peak is a  mountain summit located in Hidalgo County, New Mexico, United States.

Description
Zeller Peak is located at the northern end of the Big Hatchet Mountains which are set in the New Mexico Bootheel. It is set within the Big Hatchet Mountains Wilderness Study Area, on land managed by the Bureau of Land Management. The remote mountain is situated 70 miles southwest of the town of Deming, two miles north of Big Hatchet Peak, and can be seen from Highway 81.

Etymology
This landform's toponym was officially adopted by the United States Board on Geographic Names in 1979 to honor Dr. Robert A. Zeller Jr. (1921–1970). Zeller was a geologist and naturalist who spent more than 10 years studying the geology of the Big Hatchet Mountains, and wrote his Ph.D. dissertation about these mountains. Following his death in an airplane crash in Arizona, he was remembered as one of the most able geologists to ever live and work in the state of New Mexico.

Gallery

See also
 List of mountain peaks of New Mexico

References

External links
 Zeller Peak: weather forecast

Mountains of New Mexico
Mountains of Hidalgo County, New Mexico
North American 2000 m summits
New Mexico Bootheel